Leroy Matthiesen (June 11, 1921 – March 22, 2010) was an American prelate of the Roman Catholic Church.  He served as the sixth bishop of the Diocese of Amarillo in  Texas from 1980 to 1997.

Biography

Early life 
Leroy Matthiesen was born June 11, 1921, in Olfen, an unincorporated community in Runnels County, Texas.  He grew up on a cotton farm.

Priesthood 
Matthiesen was ordained a priest by Cardinal Amleto Cicognani for the Diocese of Amarillo on March 10, 1946. After receiving a Master of Journalism degree in 1948, Matthiesen was appointed editor of the diocesan newspaper The West Texas Catholic.  The paper featured his column “Wise and Otherwise” until 1998.

In 1954, Matthiesen was appointed the founding pastor of St. Laurence Parish in Amarillo. In 1961. he received a Master of School Administration degree and in 1962 was appointed rector of St. Lucian's Preparatory Seminary in Amarillo.

Matthiesen was awarded a Doctor of Journalism degree in 1961, and in 1968  was named principal of Alamo Catholic High School. During this period, he also served for nine years as pastor of St. Francis Parish in Amarillo.

Bishop of Amarillo 
On May 30, 1980, Pope Paul II appointed Matthiesen as bishop of the Diocese of Amarillo.  He was consecrated on May 30, 1980. by Archbishop Patrick Flores. Matthiesen received the Isaac Hecker Award for Social Justice in 1984.  In September 1981, in protest of the assembly of the neutron bomb at a facility in Pantex, Texas, Matthiesen called for workers there to resign their jobs in protest.  None were reported to have obeyed his call.  He remarked:  ''I'm no rabble rouser. On the whole I accomplished what I wanted to by bringing an issue to the consciousness of people. It's amazing how people have begun to live with the unlivable.''In 1992, Matthiessen called for a stay of execution for Johnny Frank Garrett, a Texas man convicted of raping and murdering 76 year-old Sister Tadea Benz at an Amarillo convent.  Garrett was executed on February 12, 1992.

Matthiesen admitted eight priests into the Diocese of Amarillo after they had undergone treatment following accusations of sexual impropriety.  His most controversial priest assignments are John Salazar and Ed Graff.  Both of these priests were known to be serious sexual abusers and Matthiesen was warned not to assign them to parishes by other Church officials.

Retirement and legacy 
On January 21, 1997, John Paul II accepted Matthiesen's resignation as bishop of the Diocese of Amarillo.  Matthiesen received the Ketteler Award for Social Justice from the Sisters of Divine Providence in 2002.  In 2002, he celebrated mass at a conference center in Louisville, Kentucky, to commemorate the 25th anniversary of New Ways Ministry.  This mass violated a Vatican directive not to celebrate mass for this group.

In 2003, the diocese settled a lawsuit brought by a Texas woman.  She claimed that Rosendo Herrera, a priest in the diocese, had impregnated her when she was 17 years ago. The plaintiff claimed that the diocese and Matthiessen tried to cover up the scandal.  The diocese settled for approximately $27,000 for the child.  In November 2004, the diocese settled a lawsuit for $50,000 in which Matthiessen was listed as a codefendant.  A different female plaintiff claimed that Herrera had engaged in wrongful contact with her. Also in 2004, Matthiessen stirred controversy when he started a fundraising effort to assist three priests whom his successor bishop had removed from public ministry.

In 2009, Matthiessen was presented with the Teacher of Peace Award from Pax Christi USA. In his retirement, Matthiesen published three books:

 Wise and Otherwise: The Life and Times of a Cottonpicking Texas Bishop (2004) 
 The Golden Years: The History of St. Laurence Cathedral in Amarillo (2005)
 Lieber Bernard und Elise: The Lives and Times of a German Texas Family (2009)

Leroy Matthiesen died on March 22, 2010, in Amarillo at age 88.

Notes

1921 births
2010 deaths
People from Runnels County, Texas
20th-century Roman Catholic bishops in the United States
21st-century Roman Catholic bishops in the United States
Roman Catholic bishops of Amarillo